Boyy Friennd is a 2005 Indian Malayalam-language romantic drama film directed by Vinayan and written by J. Pallassery from a story by Vinayan. The film stars Manikuttan, Madhumitha, and Honey Rose. The film was released on 28 October 2005.

Plot

This is a movie about Ramesh, a college student and his widowed mother Nandhini, and how their normal life takes a turn when a minister named Nadeshan, who has a grudge against them is found murdered and they gets suspected for the murder.

Cast
 Manikuttan as Rameshan
 Madhumitha as Lekha
 Honey Rose as Julie
 Mukesh as Home Minister Nateshan and Dineshan (Double Tole)
 Sreenivasan as Commissioner "Idiyan" Kartha
 Lakshmi Gopalaswamy as Nandhini, Rameshan's Mother 
 Lalu Alex as Father Kacharathara
 Jagadish as CI Vigneshwaran      
 Harisree Asokan as Thankappan
 Augustine as Dasappan   
 K. B. Ganesh Kumar as Prasad, Rameshan's Father
 Sadiq as SP Alex Paul
 Bindu Panikkar as Mary Pius Madame
 Idavela Babu as Arumukhan
 T. P. Madhavan as Leader K.R
 Captain Raju as DGP
 Spadikam George as ADGP
 Mammukoya as Khader
 Chandra Lakshman as Khader's daughter
 Priyanka as Durga
 Chali Pala as ASI Bhargavan
 Kollam Ajith as SI of Police
 Mammootty as himself (VFX)
 Mohanlal as himself (VFX)
 K. J. Yesudas (special appearance in the song "Ramzan Nilavotha")
 Krishnaprabha

Soundtrack
Music: M. Jayachandran, Lyrics: Kaithapram Damodaran Namboothiri, R. K. Damodaran

 "Omane" - Sujatha Mohan, K. K. Nishad
 "Ramzan Nilaavotha" - K. J. Yesudas
 "Ramzan Nilaavotha" (D) - K. J. Yesudas, Binni Krishnakumar
 "Vennilaa" - Afsal, Cicily
 "Yo Yo Payya Mittayi Payya Thattenkil Thattinu Mutti Pottikkumeda" - Jyotsna, Alex Kayyalaykkal, Ranjini Jose

References

External links
 

2000s Malayalam-language films
Films directed by Vinayan